The Convention on the Protection and Promotion of the Diversity of Cultural Expressions is a treaty adopted in October 2005 in Paris during the 33rd session of the General Conference of the United Nations Educational, Scientific and Cultural Organization (UNESCO) reaffirming and referring to the Universal Declaration of Human Rights and the UNESCO Universal Declaration on Cultural Diversity. The agreement comes into effect in March 2007.

The political debate between trade and culture is the genesis of its creation.  The idea of protecting cultural diversity is a response to the fears of homogenization of culture generated by globalization processes. In the 2000s, UNESCO members developed two instruments to protect this diversity: the 2003 Convention for the Safeguarding of the Intangible Cultural Heritage and the 2005 Convention on the Protection and Promotion of the Diversity of Cultural Expressions.

Background
The Convention on the Protection and Promotion of the Diversity of Cultural Expressions is a precursor for seven UNESCO conventions which deal with the four core areas of creative diversity; cultural and natural heritage, movable cultural property, intangible cultural heritage and contemporary creativity. These seven UNESCO conventions include the Universal Copyright Convention (1952, followed by a revision in 1971), the Convention for the Protection of Cultural Property in the Event of Armed Conflict (1954/1999), the Convention on the Means of Prohibiting and Preventing the Illicit Import, Export and Transfer of Ownership of Cultural Property (1970), the Convention Concerning the Protection of World Cultural and Natural Heritage (1972), the Convention on the Protection of the Underwater Cultural Heritage (2001), the Convention for the Safeguarding of the Intangible Cultural Heritage (2003), and the Convention on the Protection and Promotion of the Diversity of Cultural Expressions (2005).

The Convention on the Protection and Promotion of the Diversity of Cultural Expressions deals with specific articles in the UNESCO Universal Declaration on Cultural Diversity, Articles 8 through 11. These articles clarify three issues. First, the relationship that identity has with cultural goods and services, which values and meaning should not be treated as economic goods. Second, the States have the responsibility for the protection and promotion for the "diversity of cultural expressions and ensuring the free flow of ideas and works". Third, there needs to be international co-operation.

The Convention on the Protection and Promotion of the Diversity of Cultural Expressions is a legally binding international agreement that ensures artists, cultural professionals, practitioners and citizens worldwide can create, produce, disseminate and enjoy a broad range of cultural goods, services and activities, including their own. Cultural expressions are conveyed by activities, goods and services, which results in an economic and cultural nature. Due to this dual sided nature, cultural expressions cannot be seen purely as objects of trade.

The Convention on the Protection and Promotion of the Diversity of Cultural Expressions main objective is to strengthen creation, production, distribution/dissemination, access and enjoyment of cultural expressions transmitted by cultural activities, goods and services, with a strong focus on developing countries. The promotion of dialogue and creativity of cultural diversity is a necessary element in the goal to achieve peace and sustainable development.

The convention's main objective is to provide a legally binding international agreement that reaffirms the sovereign right of States to adopt cultural policies that support their cultural industries. The Convention does not want to control and restrict cultural expressions, but to promote and protect them. Recognizing that the diversity of cultural expressions is a "rich asset for individuals and societies, the protection, promotion and maintenance of cultural diversity are an essential requirement for sustainable development for the benefit of present and future generations.". The convention also defines cultural industry and interculturality.

The background and negotiations leading up to the adoption of the 2005 Convention

Context leading to the negotiation of a binding legal instrument on cultural diversity

The impact of trade liberalization on the cultural policies of states 
The concept of diversity of cultural expressions is the result of a paradigm shift in the way the special status of culture is considered in international relations, particularly in the context of agreements aimed at liberalizing trade. It succeeds the concepts of cultural exception or cultural exemption that appeared during the 1980s. The awareness on the part of certain States of the impacts of the liberalization of economic exchanges on their cultural policies is the trigger for the emergence of the concept of cultural diversity and the need to protect the diversity of cultural expressions, particularly because of the strength of the Hollywood film market.

The 2005 Convention was born out of a desire to "reconcile the seemingly irreconcilable objectives of cultural policies or the protection of cultural diversity on the one hand, and trade policies or the liberalization of international trade on the other". It is important to outline the circumstances that led to the development of the concept of cultural diversity in order to understand the impetus for the adoption of a Universal Declaration on Cultural Diversity in 2001, followed by the adoption of a Convention on the Protection and Promotion of the Diversity of Cultural Expressions in 2005.

The liberalization of economic exchanges, also known as "globalization" or free trade, essentially consists of the progressive lowering of tariff and non-tariff barriers to trade with a view to facilitating the movement of goods, services and capital between states. In several agreements, states also have some leeway, often variable, to exclude certain economic sectors from their commitments or to establish exceptions to protect national policies that would otherwise be incompatible with their trade commitments (e.g., environmental, social, cultural policies, etc.).

At the multilateral level, trade liberalization was first stimulated by the adoption in 1947 of the General Agreement on Tariffs and Trade (GATT 1947). A reform of the multilateral trading system carried out within the framework of the Uruguay Round negotiations (1986-1994) made it possible to integrate the GATT 1947 into a much broader set of multilateral trade agreements. These agreements, annexed to the Marrakech Declaration of 1994, came into force on 1 January 1995. They led simultaneously to the creation and implementation of the GATT. They lead simultaneously to the creation and entry into operation of the World Trade Organization (WTO).

The 1947 GATT already recognized the cultural specificity of the film sector by allowing states to maintain certain types of screen quotas to ensure the broadcasting of national films. When the trade system was being reformed in the 1980s and 1990s, Canada and France asked that special treatment be given to audiovisual services in the new General Agreement on Trade in Services (GATS) then under negotiation. The United States firmly opposed this, which led to the "failure of the cultural exception", an expression that reflects the impossibility of excluding the cultural sector from the reformed multilateral trade system. This was compounded by the failure to negotiate a Multilateral Agreement on Investment, whose consolidated draft text suggested the inclusion of a general cultural exception clause, as well as the failure to launch a new round of trade negotiations at the Third WTO Ministerial Conference in Seattle in December 1999.

The vulnerability of state cultural policies is also apparent in some trade disputes, most notably in Canada - Certain Measures Concerning Periodicals. In that case, the Panel rejected one of Canada's arguments that, because the content of Canadian and U.S. periodicals differ, the products are not similar and, therefore, may be treated differently by Canada. In the end, certain measures to protect the Canadian periodical industry were not adopted. As a result of this case, certain measures designed to protect the Canadian periodical industry are found to be inconsistent with Articles III and XI of the GATT 1994.

In the wake of these events, one question remains unresolved: should products with cultural value be treated like any other commodity? Some states say yes. Some states answer in the affirmative. They believe that it is necessary to adopt a legal instrument that is independent of the WTO's multilateral trade system in order to recognize the dual nature, economic and cultural, of cultural goods and services.

Moreover, the recognition of this dual nature is reflected in certain bilateral or regional trade agreements that include cultural exemption clauses. The first agreement to contain a cultural exemption clause was the Canada-US Free Trade Agreement of 1988. In concluding this agreement, Canada was a pioneer in defending its cultural policies in a context of economic integration. This clause is renewed in the North American Free Trade Agreement (NAFTA), which came into force on 1 January 1994, and the Canada-United States-Mexico Agreement (CUSA) signed on 30 November 2018, which is scheduled to come into force on 1 July 2020. In all three of these agreements, the cultural exemption is accompanied by a retaliation clause that allows another Party to retaliate against Canada if it uses a cultural policy that is otherwise inconsistent with the commitments under the agreement.

The application of trade rules to cultural products raises a particular problem. By making commitments in economic agreements, states agree to eliminate all forms of discrimination between domestic and imported cultural products. In doing so, they are gradually relinquishing their cultural sovereignty, that is, their ability to develop cultural policies and provide support for their own cultural industries, which reflect their identity. In this sense, the very foundations of free trade make it difficult to recognize the specific nature of cultural products, which are bearers of identity, value and meaning, hence the need to incorporate cultural exception and cultural exemption clauses (cultural clauses) into economic agreements.

Although these clauses are multiplying, concern remains in cultural circles about the progressive liberalization of the cultural sector and the repeated characterization of cultural products as mere "merchandise". In fact, cultural clauses receive a mixed reception during trade negotiations. Some states consider them to be "protectionist" and therefore antithetical to the ideology of free trade, which favors open markets. The United States generally refuses to incorporate such clauses into the free trade agreements it negotiates.

The concept of cultural diversity allows for a more positive perspective and a more positive approach to free trade. It allows for a balance to be struck between the economic benefits of opening up economies and taking into account the specificity of cultural products.

The choice of UNESCO as the appropriate forum to negotiate a new agreement on the diversity of cultural expressions 
Faced with the fact that the commitments made within the WTO did not allow for the recognition of the dual nature of cultural goods and services, some States decided at the end of the 1990s to move the debate to UNESCO. On the one hand, UNESCO's Constitution, and particularly Articles 1 and 2, make it the appropriate international forum for this debate.  On the other hand, the United States was not a member of this Organization at the time (it rejoined UNESCO in 2003 when the negotiation of the convention was launched), which created a favourable context for the development of a multilateral instrument aimed at protecting cultural diversity.

In 1998, the Action Plan on Cultural Policies for Development drawn up at the Stockholm Conference made a recommendation in favour of the specificity of cultural goods and services. This action plan sets the stage for developments in cultural diversity from the early 2000s onwards.

Adoption of the 2001 UNESCO Universal Declaration on Cultural Diversity 
The UNESCO Universal Declaration on Cultural Diversity was adopted unanimously (188 Member States) on 2 November 2001, in the aftermath of the September 11 attacks. In this context, the States affirm "that respect for the diversity of cultures, tolerance, dialogue and cooperation, in a climate of mutual trust and understanding, are among the best guarantees of international peace and security". It represents an opportunity to "categorically reject the thesis of inescapable conflicts of cultures and civilizations ".

In Article 8 of the Declaration, UNESCO members affirm that "cultural goods and services [...], because they convey identity, values and meaning, should not be treated as commodities or consumer goods like any other. In Article 9, the role of cultural policies is defined as a tool to "create conditions conducive to the production and dissemination of diversified cultural goods and services". The importance of international cooperation is affirmed in Article 10.

The adoption of this Declaration, a non-binding legal instrument, is a first step towards the development of the 2005 Convention. The desirability of negotiating a binding international legal instrument is set out in Annex II of the Declaration, in the first paragraph of the Action Plan for the Implementation of the UNESCO Declaration on Cultural Diversity. Several articles of the Declaration are included in the Convention on the Protection and Promotion of the Diversity of Cultural Expressions negotiated from 2003 to 2005.

The role of the Organisation mondiale de la Francophonie (OIF) in the adoption of the 2005 Convention 
In adopting the Cotonou Declaration and its action plan, the OIF committed to supporting draft international instruments on cultural diversity, recalling the importance of this concept for peace and the sustainability of cultural expressions in a context of globalization.

The role of civil society in the adoption of the 2005 Convention 
Civil society is involved in the debates leading up to the 2005 Convention.

The International Network on Cultural Policy (INCP) 
The INCP was born out of a Canadian initiative in 1998 following an international conference on cultural policies. Twenty-one countries and civil society representatives agreed on the need for an international instrument on cultural diversity. Professor Ivan Bernier tabled a draft instrument in November 2001 as a consultant.

The Coalition for the Diversity of Cultural Expressions (CDCE) 
Founded in Quebec in 1998, the Coalition for the Diversity of Cultural Expressions was instrumental in the birth of the movement that led to the adoption of the 2005 Convention. It was the instigator of four International Meetings of Cultural Professional Organizations, from 2001 to 2005.  In addition, "[t]here are now some thirty coalitions for cultural diversity (Argentina, Australia, Belgium, Benin, Brazil, Burkina Faso, Cameroon, Canada, Chile, Colombia, Congo, Ecuador, France, Germany, Guinea, Hungary, Ireland, Italy, Mali, Mexico, Morocco, New Zealand, Peru, Senegal, Slovakia, Spain, Switzerland, Togo, Uruguay) who have tried to convince their governments not to make any liberalization commitments in the cultural sector and have supported the project of an international convention on cultural diversity from the beginning."

The International Network for Cultural Diversity (INCD) 
The International Network for Cultural Diversity has drafted a Convention with an emphasis on cultural goods and services.

The negotiations of the 2005 Convention text

The Preliminary Draft Convention 
In the fall of 2003, the General Conference, invited by the executive board, gave the Director General the mandate to launch the work for the elaboration of the convention. The Preliminary Draft Convention was the result of three meetings in which fifteen independent experts participated. These meetings took place from 17 to 20 December 2003, from 30 March to 3 April 2004, and at the end of May 2004. The Preliminary Draft Convention was distributed to all States Parties. The Preliminary Draft was distributed to Member States in July 2004. It formed the basis for the intergovernmental negotiations that began in the fall of 2004 to prepare the draft Convention to be presented to the General Conference in 2005.

The first intergovernmental meeting, held from 20 to 24 September 2004, set up the negotiating structure and expressed the respective views on the type of convention to come.  Differences of opinion persist regarding the purpose of the convention, its relationship with other international agreements and the level of commitment required.

At the second intergovernmental meeting, the Plenary Assembly considered almost all of the provisions of the Preliminary Draft. The terms "cultural expressions", "protection" and "protect", as well as "cultural goods and services", were discussed, as was the dispute settlement mechanism.

At the third intergovernmental meeting, a working group was charged with finding a compromise between the positions expressed to date on the relationship of the convention to other treaties.  A stormy vote on the text of Article 20 led the United States to request registration of its formal opposition to the adopted text. Between the end of the negotiations and the 33rd General Conference of UNESCO, the United States led a campaign to reopen the negotiations. Canada responded by proposing that the preliminary draft be considered a draft convention and voted on for adoption at the 33rd session of the General Conference, which it was.

General objectives to the 2005 convention

The main objective for the Convention on the Protection and Promotion of the Diversity of Cultural Expressions is to protect and promote the diversity of cultural expressions. The Convention highlights the fact that cultural creativity has been placed upon all of humanity and that aside from economical gains, creative diversity reaps plenty of cultural and social advantages. States must also promote "openness to other cultures of the world". Protective measures are also included in the convention and international co-operation is encouraged in times of need. This convention works to strengthen economic growth and cultural acceptance.

Additional objectives are as follows:

To reaffirm the sovereign rights of States to adopt cultural policies while ensuring the free movement of ideas and works.
To recognise the distinct nature of cultural goods and services as vehicles of values, identity and meaning.
To define a new framework for international cultural co-operation, the keystone of the Convention
To create the conditions for cultures to flourish and freely interact in a mutually beneficial manner
To endeavour to support co-operation for sustainable development and poverty reduction, via assistance from the International Fund for Cultural Diversity.
To ensure that civil society plays a major role in the implementation of the convention.
To "strengthen international cooperation and solidarity with a view to favouring the cultural expressions of all countries, in particular those whose cultural goods and services suffer from lack of access to the means of creation, production and dissemination at the national and international level."

The convention also affirms that "Cultural diversity can be protected and promoted only if human rights and fundamental freedoms, such as freedom of expression, information and communication, as well as the ability of individuals to choose cultural expressions, are guaranteed" in a manner against a cultural relativism that may undermine universality of human rights.

Layout of the convention 
The Convention on the Protection and Promotion of the Diversity of Cultural Expressions contains the following:
Preamble
 I. Objectives and guiding Principles: Articles 1 and 2
 II. Scope of application: Article 3
 III. Definition: Article 4
 IV. Rights and obligations of Parties: Articles 5 to 19
 V. Relationship to other instruments: Articles 20 and 21
 VI. Organs of the convention: Articles 22 to 24
 VII. Final clauses: Articles 25 to 35
 Annex – Conciliation Procedures: Articles 1 to 6

The text of the 2005 Convention

The preamble 
In accordance with Article 31 of the Vienna Convention on the Law of Treaties, the preamble forms part of the text of a convention and may be used to interpret it.  Its role is to summarize the purpose of an agreement and to set the legal context in which it is to be found.

The Preamble to the 2005 Convention on the Diversity of Cultural Expressions opens with an affirmation that "cultural diversity is an inherent characteristic of humanity" and that it "constitutes a common heritage of humanity" (paragraphs 1 and 2). Cultural diversity is also seen as "a mainspring for the sustainable development of communities, peoples and nations" (paragraph 3). Respect for all cultures is promoted, including those of persons belonging to minorities and indigenous peoples (paragraph 15).

One of the key messages conveyed by the preamble to the convention is that the diversity of cultural expressions is subject to pressure from its treatment in trade negotiations, thus announcing the legitimacy of measures to be taken to preserve, safeguard and enhance it. Thus, the General Conference of UNESCO "notes that the processes of globalization, facilitated by the rapid development of information and communication technologies, while creating unprecedented conditions for greater interaction between cultures, also represent a challenge for cultural diversity, particularly with regard to the risks of imbalances between rich and poor countries" (paragraph 19). In this respect, the Preamble suggests that culture be included "as a strategic element in national and international development policies, as well as in international cooperation for development" (paragraph 6).

A reference to the dual nature of cultural goods and services also appears in the Preamble (paragraph 18). The General Conference states that it is "convinced that cultural activities, goods and services have a dual nature, economic and cultural, because they convey identities, values and meanings and must therefore not be treated as having exclusively commercial value.

Finally, the Preamble contains numerous references to aspects that are on the periphery of the scope of the Convention, yet intimately linked to the diversity of cultural expressions, including intellectual property rights, the protection of fundamental rights and freedoms, linguistic diversity and traditional knowledge and expressions.

The objectives, article 1 
Article 1 of the Convention sets out nine objectives. In addition to the general objective of "protecting and promoting the diversity of cultural expressions" (paragraph (a)), the Parties pursue, inter alia, the following objectives [...] (g) to recognize the distinctive nature of cultural activities, goods and services as vehicles of identity, values and meaning; (h) to reaffirm the sovereign right of States to maintain, adopt and implement policies and measures that they deem appropriate for the protection and promotion of the diversity of cultural expressions within their territory [... ]" and "to strengthen international cooperation and solidarity in a spirit of partnership in order, inter alia, to increase the capacities of developing countries to protect and promote the diversity of cultural expressions.

Guiding Principles, Article 2 
The Convention has eight guiding principles. They serve as a guide for the interpretation of the commitments made by the Parties. These principles are:

 Principle of respect for human rights and fundamental freedoms (paragraph 1)
 Principle of sovereignty (paragraph 2)
 Principle of equal dignity and respect for all cultures (paragraph 3)
 Principle of international solidarity and cooperation (paragraph 4)
 Principle of the complementarity of economic and cultural aspects of development (paragraph 5)
 Principle of sustainable development (paragraph 6)
 Principle of equitable access (paragraph 7)
 Principle of openness and balance (paragraph 8)

Scope of application, Article 3 
Article 3 of the Convention sets out the scope of application: "This Convention shall apply to the policies and measures adopted by the Parties relating to the protection and promotion of the diversity of cultural expressions.

The scope of application has become progressively clearer. Professor Ivan Bernier explains:"Later, as the negotiations progressed, the words cultural contents and artistic expressions were replaced by cultural expressions for reasons of simplicity and clarity, since cultural contents had to be expressed in one form or another, and artistic expressions were also cultural."

Definitions, Article 4 
Definitions help to clarify the meaning of a term in the specific context of the legal instrument. The 2005 Convention contains definitions of the following terms: "Cultural diversity", "Cultural content", "Cultural expressions", "Cultural activities, goods and services", "Cultural industries", "Cultural policies and measures", "Protection" and "Interculturality".

The definitions of "cultural expressions", "cultural content", and "cultural activities, goods and services" must be read in conjunction with each other in order to fully understand the scope of the convention. First, cultural expressions "are those expressions that result from the creativity of individuals, groups and societies and that have cultural content.  This cultural content "refers to the symbolic meaning, artistic dimension and cultural values that originate from or express cultural identities.  Thus, cultural activities, goods and services covered by the Convention are those that "refer to activities, goods and services which, when considered from the point of view of their specific quality, use or purpose, embody or convey cultural expressions, irrespective of the commercial value they may have. Cultural activities may be an end in themselves, or they may contribute to the production of cultural goods and services.  The preliminary draft of the Convention even contained a non-exhaustive list of what might constitute a cultural good or service, but the Parties eventually withdrew this list.

In other words, a cultural activity, good, service or product must result from creativity (Art. 4.3), have symbolic meaning, an artistic dimension and cultural values that originate from or express cultural identities (Art. 4.2), regardless of their commercial value (Art. 4.4).  Moreover, as formulated, the definitions allow States to develop cultural policies for digital cultural products.

The Convention creates several new concepts and uses similar expressions to some already known, thus requiring stakeholders to make a "semantic effort".

First, the notion of "cultural diversity" is easily confused with the analogous terms "interculturality", "interculturalism", "multiculturalism" or "cultural pluralism".  In the sense of the 2005 Convention, "Cultural diversity refers to the multiplicity of forms in which the cultures of groups and societies find expression. These expressions are transmitted within and between groups and societies. Cultural diversity is manifested not only in the varied forms in which the cultural heritage of humanity is expressed, enriched and transmitted through the variety of cultural expressions, but also in the various modes of artistic creation, production, dissemination, distribution and enjoyment of cultural expressions, whatever the means and technologies used."

This definition creates the link with the Universal Declaration on Cultural Diversity, but also with the notion of "cultural expression".  It also refers to the "cultural heritage of humanity", which inspires both the "common heritage of humanity" and the Convention on Intangible Cultural Heritage. This interweaving of legal concepts encourages a comprehensive understanding of each in order to identify what "cultural diversity" is.

Rights and obligations of the parties

Right to implement cultural policies, Article 5 
The Convention reaffirms the sovereign right of States to legislate in the cultural sector and promotes the creation of conditions in which cultural expressions can flourish and interact freely in a mutually beneficial manner.

Rights and obligations at the national level, Articles 6 to 11 
Article 6 provides an illustrative list of measures that states may use to exercise their sovereign right to adopt cultural policies of their choice. This list includes the use of quotas or subsidies.

The obligation to promote cultural expressions is set out in Article 7. Parties to the Convention have an obligation to take measures to promote cultural expressions within their territory. In order to detail this obligation, the Conference of Parties adopted at its 2nd session the Operational Guidelines - Measures to Promote Cultural Expressions. The Guidelines mention that measures may relate to all stages of the production chain (creation, production, distribution/dissemination, access) and list a series of tools through which they may be implemented.

Paragraphs 1 and 2 of Article 8 set out the powers of a State to identify a situation where a cultural expression is in need of "urgent safeguarding" and to take "all appropriate measures". Article 8 does not have the effect of restricting the general right of intervention of States under Articles 5 and 6.

However, the third paragraph of Article 8, which is mandatory rather than permissive in nature, requires the parties to notify the Intergovernmental Committee of any such measure. The Committee may then make appropriate recommendations. The committee's role in this context is framed by the Operational Directives, which give it the power to examine and make recommendations. It also has the power of denunciation, under the guise of cooperation measures, in that it can disseminate this information to other parties. Article 8 can be read in conjunction with Articles 12 and 17 of the convention.

Cultural cooperation and international solidarity, articles 12, 14 to 19 
Article 12 sets out the five objectives of States in relation to international cooperation.

Article 14 provides the parties with a non-exhaustive list of north–south, North-North and South-South international cultural cooperation measures. The cooperation measures relate to the strengthening of cultural industries, capacity building, transfer of technology and know-how, and financial support. They are detailed in the Operational Guidelines.

Article 15 is the most explicit provision for partnerships between public authorities and civil society. The purpose of partnerships is, among other things, to respond to the concrete needs of developing countries.

Article 16 contains one of the most binding commitments of the 2005 Convention. It states that "[d]eveloped countries shall facilitate cultural exchanges with developing countries by granting, through appropriate institutional and legal frameworks, preferential treatment to their artists and other cultural professionals and practitioners, as well as to their cultural goods and services.

The obligation to "facilitate cultural exchanges" rests with developed countries and must benefit developing countries. The Guidelines specify the contours applicable to measures relating to preferential treatment. This is the first time that a binding agreement in the cultural field has explicitly referred to "preferential treatment".

The means to achieve this is the establishment of "institutional and legal frameworks" to facilitate the movement of persons ("artists and other cultural professionals and practitioners") and cultural products ("cultural goods and services"). Preferential treatment measures can be cultural in nature (e.g., hosting artists from developing countries in artists' residencies in developed countries), commercial in nature (e.g., easing the demands of artists in developed countries), or commercial in nature (e.g., facilitating the movement of cultural goods and services) or mixed, i.e., both cultural and commercial (e.g., entering into a film co-production agreement that includes measures that facilitate access to the developed country market for the co-produced work).

Three agreements with cultural cooperation protocols concluded by the European Union are examples of best practices in the implementation of Article 16 of the 2005 Convention. They contain elaborate frameworks for cultural cooperation with certain developing countries, while being attached to a trade agreement. Other parties have opted for the adoption of preferential treatment clauses integrated directly into the framework of the trade agreement.

Parties also have an obligation to cooperate in situations of serious threat to cultural expressions under Article 17.

The International Fund for Cultural Diversity (IFCD) was created as a result of the demands of developing countries and is established under Article 18 of the 2005 Convention.  It is made up of voluntary contributions from Member States. Indeed, no contribution is mandatory for the parties to the convention. This creates some uncertainty as to the sustainability of the funding and ensures that the establishment of the Fund is based on the principle of "hierarchical solidarity" rather than "reciprocity".

The allocation of financial resources to developing countries that are parties to the convention is based on their interest in developing their cultural policies and cultural industries. Since 2010, approximately 114 projects in 58 developing countries have been carried out with funding from the IFCD.

The integration of culture in sustainable development 
Article 13 sets out the obligation of the parties to integrate culture into their sustainable development policies at all levels. This article echoes article 11 of the UNESCO Universal Declaration on Cultural Diversity, which describes cultural diversity as "a guarantee of sustainable human development".

Relationship with other instruments

Mutual support, complementarity and non-subordination, Article 20 
Determining the relationship between the convention and other treaties is one of the significant difficulties encountered in the negotiations of the 2005 Convention.  The thorny question is whether the convention will prevail over, or be subordinate to, other existing or future international agreements negotiated by States parties, should there be competition between the commitments they have undertaken.

The way to provide for these situations is to adopt a "relationship with other instruments" clause. In this way, the subordination link is explicitly provided for in accordance with the will of the States parties as expressed in a treaty. If such a clause is provided for, then only as a last resort will the general rules of interpretation of international law (provided for in the 1969 Vienna Convention on the Law of Treaties) be used.

In the case of the 2005 Convention, as soon as the question of a "preliminary study on the technical and legal aspects relating to the desirability of a standard-setting instrument on cultural diversity" was included, the positions of the States were polarized on this issue of the linkage between the treaties.

Some states, including the United States, Japan, New Zealand, Tunisia and India, question the need for or merits of such a clause and simply propose to delete it. France, Canada and China, on the other hand, would like to see the Convention placed on an equal footing with other instruments. The great majority of States also expressed themselves in this sense. They consider that the dual nature of cultural goods and services deserves that they be treated by both the WTO and UNESCO texts.

The need to incorporate such a clause was finally agreed upon. During the course of the Intergovernmental Meetings of Experts, several textual options were formulated in order to establish its scope. There emerged a desire to seek complementarity and non-hierarchy between the convention and other international legal instruments.

Professor Ivan Bernier explains the opposition that persists among States regarding the relationship between the convention and other international instruments in the following way:"First of all, it must be noted that there is a significant gap between Members on this issue. What is essentially problematic is their opposing vision of how to manage the culture/trade interface, understood here as the meeting point of cultural concerns and trade concerns.  For a number of Members, it must be clear that under no circumstances should cultural concerns interfere in any way with trade concerns. In other words, trade concerns, in such situations, should take precedence over cultural concerns. But for a clear majority of Members, this is unacceptable."A median wording proposed by the European Union and on which the final version of the treaty relationship clause will be based softens the binding character of the promotion of the Convention in other international fora and promotes the absence of hierarchy between the convention and other international instruments. The final version of the wording of Article 20 is thus an illustration of a compromise. Article 20: Relationship with other instruments: mutual supportiveness, complementarity and non-subordination

The Parties recognize that they must fulfill in good faith their obligations under this Convention and all other treaties to which they are parties. Thus, without subordinating this Convention to other treaties :

(a) they shall encourage mutual supportiveness between this Convention and other treaties to which they are parties; and

(b) when interpreting and applying the other treaties to which they are parties or when entering into other international obligations, the Parties shall take into account the relevant provisions of this Convention.

Nothing in this Convention shall be interpreted as modifying the rights and obligations of Parties under other treaties to which they are parties.

Promotion of the Convention in other international forums, Article 21 
Article 20 on the Relationship between other instruments should be read in conjunction with Article 21 on International Consultation and Coordination. Under the latter, the Parties "undertake to promote the objectives and principles of this Convention in other international forums. To this end, the Parties shall consult, as appropriate, bearing in mind these objectives and principles.

The term "other international fora" refers in particular to the World Trade Organization (WTO), the World Intellectual Property Organization (WIPO), the Organisation for Economic Co-operation and Development (OECD), but also to more informal bilateral or regional fora or negotiating groups.

Bodies of the Convention

The Conference of Parties and the Intergovernmental Committee together form the "governing bodies" of the convention.  They act as a "political forum on the future of cultural policy and international cooperation".

Conference of the parties 

The Conference of the Parties is established by Article 22 of the convention. It is composed of all the countries that have ratified the convention. It meets every two years, or extraordinarily at the request of one third of the parties, submitted to the Intergovernmental Committee. Key administrative, operational and strategic decisions are taken in its forum.

To date, seven ordinary sessions have been held, the first of which was held in Paris from 18 to 20 June 2007.

Intergovernmental Committee 
The Intergovernmental Committee is established by Article 23 of the convention.  It is composed of 24 Parties elected by the Conference of the Parties from all regions of the world. Members are given a four-year term and meet annually.

Under its Rules of Procedure, the Intergovernmental Committee may invite organizations and individuals to participate in its meetings at any time. The committee is assisted by the UNESCO Secretariat.

Secretariat 
The Secretariat is based at UNESCO headquarters in Paris. It assists in the preparation of documents used by the Conference of Parties and the Intergovernmental Committee at their respective statutory meetings.

It also participates in the financing of innovative projects through the International Fund for Cultural Diversity, provides training in the areas of cultural policy design and implementation, policy monitoring and evaluation, and project development, and promotes the collection, analysis, and exchange of information.

The role of civil society

In accordance with Article 11 of the 2005 Convention, civil society organizations are involved at several levels in the implementation and promotion of the convention. Although they cannot attend the Conferences of the Parties, they can attend, by invitation, the meetings of the Intergovernmental Committee, participate in funding, contribute their expertise, or receive grants for the realization of IFCD Innovative Projects. In 2016, 68% of innovative projects involved civil society.

Coalition for the Diversity of Cultural Expressions

The Research Chairs 
For some years now, civil society has also included UNESCO Chairs whose research objectives are linked to those of the 2005 Convention. As such, these Chairs can play a role in the implementation of the convention, generating independent reflection on which actors (governments, civil society organizations, the Secretariat of the 2005 Convention) can draw on to develop certain policies for the protection and promotion of the diversity of cultural expressions and to make decisions. For example, the UNESCO Chair on the Diversity of Cultural Expressions, launched in November 2016, participates in the implementation of the convention and in the development of knowledge through research projects, publications, the organization of scientific or general public events, or the creation of pedagogical tools (e.g., the database listing cultural clauses in trade agreements). Much of the work of the UNESCO Chair on the Diversity of Cultural Expressions is currently focused on the implementation of this treaty in the digital environment.

Custodians and beneficiaries to the convention

All cultural actors are required to participate as custodians to the Convention on the Protection and Promotion of the Diversity of Cultural Expressions. These include States and institutions recognised by the convention, civil actors and civil society, private actors, such as cultural enterprises and industries, especially in developing nations and minorities and indigenous peoples.

The beneficiaries to the convention are unlimited. The Convention benefits all peoples because the ability to participate and promote cultural diversity is profitable for all individuals and societies. Also, recognition for the creators of cultural expressions and the communities that celebrate their works. A major beneficiary to the convention are the artists and practitioners of the cultural expressions. In addition to the broad ranged beneficiaries, the Convention lists several specific groups such as women, indigenous peoples, minorities, and artists and practitioners of developing nations The Convention provides such need based nations financial assistance for the artists and practitioners of cultural expressions.

Ratification and signatures

Entry into force 
In accordance with its Article 29, the Convention entered into force three months after the deposit of the thirtieth instrument of ratification, acceptance or accession.  For parties which became members after that date, it enters into force for them three months after the deposit of their instrument.

Number of signatory states 
To date, the convention has been ratified by 148 signatory states, as well as the European Union. Canada was the first state to ratify the treaty on 28 November 2005. The most recent ratifications are from Uzbekistan and Niue (15 November 2019) and Botswana (7 January 2020).

Despite a sustained wave of ratifications between 2005 and 2007, ratifications slowed down thereafter.  To address this situation, the Intergovernmental Committee is adopting a strategy and action plan for the period 2010–2013 to stimulate ratifications in the underrepresented regions of Asia, the Pacific and Arab countries.

Civil society organizations, including the International Federation of Coalitions for the Diversity of Cultural Expressions (IFCCD), play an important role in the implementation of this strategy.

The United States, an opponent 
Despite actively participating in the negotiations and influencing the drafting of the 2005 Convention, the United States refused to ratify the convention. The main argument of their opposition is that cultural products are commodities in the same way as any other goods and services. For them, the benefits of free trade extend to cultural goods and services. In October 2017, the United States announced its intention to leave UNESCO. This decision takes effect on 31 December 2018.

On the other hand, "there is a lack of willingness on the part of some Arab states, states in the Asia-Pacific region, Russia and Japan to ratify or implement this legal instrument.

Additions Made to the Convention
Operational Guidelines for the convention: A series of operational guidelines were approved by the Conference of Parties at its second ( 15–16 June 2009) and third session ( 14–15 June 2011) in Paris, France.

Rules of Procedure of the Conference of Parties to the 2005 Convention: Adopted by the Conference of Parties to the Convention at its first ( 18–20 June 2007) and second sessions ( 15–16 June 2009) in Paris, France.

Rules of Procedure of the Intergovernmental Committees for the Protection and Promotion of the Diversity of Cultural Expressions: Adopted by the Intergovernmental Committees for the Protection and Promotion of the Diversity of Cultural Expressions at its first session in Ottawa, Canada (10–13 December 2007) and approved by the Conference of Parties to the 2005 Convention at its second session in Paris, France (15–16 June 2009).

Financial Regulations for the Special Account for the International Fund for Cultural Diversity.

Framework for implementation monitoring 
The monitoring framework is structured by four overarching objectives from the convention, as well as by the desired outcomes, core indicators and means of verification.

The four objectives are: (1) Supporting sustainable cultural governance systems, (2) Achieving a balanced exchange of cultural goods and services and increasing the mobility of artists and cultural professionals, (3) Including culture in sustainable development frameworks and (4) Promoting human rights and fundamental freedoms.

The monitoring framework is based on Article 9 of the convention. It is specified by the Operational Guidelines for information sharing and transparency.  In order to respect this commitment, the parties designate a point of contact and must produce periodic reports every four years, starting from the date of deposit of its instrument of ratification, acceptance, approval or accession. These reports are examined by the Conference of the Parties and make it possible, among other things, to plan international cooperation measures by targeting the needs of countries that could benefit from them and to identify innovative measures.  Some 40 States, including Haiti, Iceland, Mali, Nicaragua and Panama, have not yet submitted any periodic report since ratifying the convention.  For the year 2020, 104 periodic reports are expected.

Implementation of the 2005 Convention in the digital environment 
The convention is drafted according to an interpretative principle of technological neutrality.  This means that it is designed to stand the test of time, without becoming outdated due to technological advancement that was not specifically foreseen at the time of its drafting.

However, it was necessary to adopt in 2017 the Operational Guidelines on the Implementation of the Convention in the Digital Environment to assist parties in interpreting the text in relation to the digital environment. The Guidelines provide for modulations in relation to the digital environment for all of the rights and obligations under the convention and are therefore necessary for their interpretation.

The early years of the convention were marked by deep uncertainty as to the qualification of digital products and the application of an appropriate legal framework.  The adoption of the Digital Guidelines resolves the applicability of the convention to digital products, recalling "the technological neutrality of the Convention".

See also
 Universal Declaration on Cultural Diversity
 2005 Convention Global Report "ReShaping Cultural Policies"
 Cultural exception

References

External links
Convention on the Protection and Promotion of the Diversity of Cultural Expressions
Convention text
UNESCO website
International Federation of Coalitions for Cultural Diversity
Canadian Coalition for Cultural Diversity
Ten Keys to the Convention on the Protection and Promotion of the Diversity of Cultural Expressions
Procedural history and related documents on the Convention on the Protection and Promotion of the Diversity of Cultural Expressions in the *Historic Archives of the United Nations Audiovisual Library of International Law
Lecture by Hélène Ruiz Fabri entitled Droit du commerce et culture: la portée de la Convention sur la diversité des expressions culturelles in the Lecture Series of the United Nations Audiovisual Library of International Law

Art and culture treaties
UNESCO treaties
Treaties concluded in 2005
Treaties entered into force in 2007
Treaties of Afghanistan
Treaties of Albania
Treaties of Algeria
Treaties of Andorra
Treaties of Angola
Treaties of Antigua and Barbuda
Treaties of Argentina
Treaties of Armenia
Treaties of Australia
Treaties of Austria
Treaties of Azerbaijan
Treaties of the Bahamas
Treaties of Bangladesh
Treaties of Barbados
Treaties of Belarus
Treaties of Belgium
Treaties of Belize
Treaties of Benin
Treaties of Bolivia
Treaties of Bosnia and Herzegovina
Treaties of Brazil
Treaties of Bulgaria
Treaties of Burkina Faso
Treaties of Burundi
Treaties of Cambodia
Treaties of Cameroon
Treaties of Canada
Treaties of the Central African Republic
Treaties of Chad
Treaties of Chile
Treaties of the People's Republic of China
Treaties of Colombia
Treaties of the Comoros
Treaties of the Republic of the Congo
Treaties of Costa Rica
Treaties of Ivory Coast
Treaties of Croatia
Treaties of Cuba
Treaties of Cyprus
Treaties of the Czech Republic
Treaties of the Democratic Republic of the Congo
Treaties of Denmark
Treaties of Djibouti
Treaties of Dominica
Treaties of the Dominican Republic
Treaties of East Timor
Treaties of Ecuador
Treaties of Egypt
Treaties of El Salvador
Treaties of Equatorial Guinea
Treaties of Estonia
Treaties of Ethiopia
Treaties entered into by the European Union
Treaties of Finland
Treaties of France
Treaties of Gabon
Treaties of the Gambia
Treaties of Georgia (country)
Treaties of Germany
Treaties of Ghana
Treaties of Greece
Treaties of Grenada
Treaties of Guatemala
Treaties of Guinea
Treaties of Guyana
Treaties of Haiti
Treaties of Honduras
Treaties of Hungary
Treaties of Iceland
Treaties of India
Treaties of Indonesia
Treaties of Iraq
Treaties of Ireland
Treaties of Italy
Treaties of Jamaica
Treaties of Jordan
Treaties of Kenya
Treaties of Kuwait
Treaties of Laos
Treaties of Latvia
Treaties of Lesotho
Treaties of Lithuania
Treaties of Luxembourg
Treaties of Madagascar
Treaties of Malawi
Treaties of Mali
Treaties of Malta
Treaties of Mauritania
Treaties of Mauritius
Treaties of Mexico
Treaties of Monaco
Treaties of Mongolia
Treaties of Montenegro
Treaties of Morocco
Treaties of Mozambique
Treaties of Namibia
Treaties of the Netherlands
Treaties of New Zealand
Treaties of Nicaragua
Treaties of Niger
Treaties of Nigeria
Treaties of Norway
Treaties of Oman
Treaties of the State of Palestine
Treaties of Panama
Treaties of Paraguay
Treaties of Peru
Treaties of Poland
Treaties of Portugal
Treaties of Qatar
Treaties of South Korea
Treaties of Moldova
Treaties of Romania
Treaties of Rwanda
Treaties of Saint Kitts and Nevis
Treaties of Saint Lucia
Treaties of Saint Vincent and the Grenadines
Treaties of Samoa
Treaties of Senegal
Treaties of Serbia
Treaties of Seychelles
Treaties of Slovakia
Treaties of Slovenia
Treaties of South Africa
Treaties of South Sudan
Treaties of Spain
Treaties of the Republic of the Sudan (1985–2011)
Treaties of Eswatini
Treaties of Sweden
Treaties of Switzerland
Treaties of Syria
Treaties of Tajikistan
Treaties of Tanzania
Treaties of North Macedonia
Treaties of Togo
Treaties of Trinidad and Tobago
Treaties of Tunisia
Treaties of Uganda
Treaties of Ukraine
Treaties of the United Arab Emirates
Treaties of the United Kingdom
Treaties of Uruguay
Treaties of Venezuela
Treaties of Vietnam
Treaties of Zimbabwe
2005 in France
Treaties extended to the Faroe Islands
Treaties extended to Greenland
Treaties extended to Hong Kong
Treaties extended to Macau
Treaties of Turkey